Pavement was a New Zealand youth culture magazine published bimonthly, and then quarterly, by Bernard McDonald and Glenn Hunt from 1993 to 2006.

History and profile
Pavement was started with the aim of creating a magazine that would focus on contemporary culture from New Zealand and the rest of the world, with particular emphasis on emerging "stars" on the cutting edge of creativity, as well as youth culture and fascinating subcultures. It included articles on contemporary music, art, film, fashion and design and often photographed people in London, New York City, Los Angeles, Paris, Sydney, Melbourne and throughout New Zealand.

People shot for its covers and/or content included Dita von Teese, Liv Tyler, Naomi Campbell, Katie Holmes, Anna Paquin, Eva Herzigova, Johnny Depp, Thandie Newton, Russell Crowe, Gisele Bündchen, Paris Hilton, Penny Pickard, Milla Jovovich, Peter Jackson, Cate Blanchett, Larry Clark, Melanie Lynskey, Leelee Sobieski, Leonardo DiCaprio, Angelina Jolie, Kerry Fox, Devon Aoki, Lucy Lawless, Oliver Stone, Kirsten Dunst, Amber Valetta, Kelly MacDonald, Christy Turlington, Pierre et Gilles, Gary Oldman, Abbie Cornish, Georgina Grenville, Rose McGowan, Bijou Phillips, Orlando Bloom, Ethan Hawke, Trish Goff, etc.

Musical artists featured included New Order, Oasis, The Veils, LTJ Bukem, The Black Angels, Suede, Throwing Muses, The Darkness, Courtney Love, Sophie Ellis Bextor, The Cramps, Massive Attack, Shirley Manson, Big Bud, Dimmer, Kylie Minogue, Tricky, Spiritualised, The Chills, Pulp, Ministry, Soundgarden, Elastica, Fabio, R.E.M.'s Michael Stipe, Pauly Fuemana, etc.

While Pavement was primarily a New Zealand magazine, it made use of overseas stylists, models, writers and photographers, including Regan Cameron, Richard Kern, Helmut Newton, Tony Kim, Max Doyle, Lionel Deluy, Pierre Toussaint, Davies & Davies, Robert Astley-Sparke, Hugh Stewart, Laurence Passera, Robert Wyatt, Russ Flatt, Ranjit Grewal, Derek Henderson, Alex Freund, Terry Richardson, etc. It was available in over 2000 outlets around New Zealand and Australia and a modest distribution in New York City and London.

It had twice been awarded New Zealand Magazine of the Year, Editor of the Year, Designer of the Year & Advertising Executive of the Year.

The magazine was renowned for its controversial content and was submitted to the Chief Censor for rating on four occasions. The first occasion was its "Raw" issue which included a spread of nudes entitled "In the Raw". The censor ruled over one picture by NYC photographer Terry Richardson, of a Japanese prostitute dressed in a schoolgirl uniform, deeming the issue R16. Two further issues, one featuring a series of nudes shot by art photographers entitled "Au Natural" and the magazine's specially themed "69" issue, were also considered by the censor, although they weren't deemed offensive. The magazine's “special teen issue” marking Pavement’s 13th year of publication in 2006 had been criticised by child advocacy group ECPAT, who lodged a complaint with the censorship compliance unit claiming that a number of images of teenage girls and one 10-year-old were "legally objectionable". Chief censor Bill Hastings felt there was a prima facie case to be answered, though no action was taken, clearing the publisher of any wrongdoing.

Editor Bernard McDonald stated that there was "only one shoot I would consider mildly provocative" and pointed out that the model in question was 19 years old, with the autobiographical essay she wrote to accompany her pictures making her age very clear. McDonald argued that the purportedly offending material was a celebration "of the idea and ideals" of being a teenager, the so-called "provocative" images of 19-year-old Megan printed under the title 'Metamorphosis' being simply those of "a teenager developing into a sexual being, as we all do." He also pointed out that the 10-year-old girl featured elsewhere in the issue was a profile story that had nothing to do with nudity or sexuality, the only connection being its inclusion in an issue that contained a small amount of topless nudity. "Jessica is not sexualised, just as Anna Paquin was not sexualised when she appeared in the very adult film The Piano," McDonald explained. Nevertheless, major bookstore chain Whitcoulls declined to display the anniversary issue, selling copies only to customers who requested them over the counter, though most other retailers didn't have a problem with the content of the issue. The Office of Film and Literature Classification eventually restricted the "special teen issue" to persons 13 years of age and over, although the issue had sold out at that point.

As a result of declining advertising revenue throughout 2006, it was announced that the magazine would cease production following its December 2006 issue, the magazine's 74th, with the issue remaining on newsstands till the end of March 2007. Hunt then set up a new magazine, 1AM, which he continues in Sydney, Australia, while McDonald wrote stories and reviewed films for the newspapers Sunday Star-Times and Herald on Sunday, New Zealand music magazine Rip It Up, Hunt's magazine 1 am, Jetstar's inflight publication and American magazine Issue, amongst other endeavours.

A decade after the magazine ceased being published, i-D Australia revisited the history of the magazine, publishing an online article entitled 'the rise, fall, and hedonistic rule of 90s magazine pavement'. "Pavement ran for 13 very busy years. In a little over a decade the team shot everyone from Naomi Campbell, Christy Turlington, Johnny Depp, and Leonardo DiCaprio to Cate Blanchett, Angelina Jolie, Courtney Love, and even some of the very first pictures of an emerging model named Gisele Bündchen." The article also ran a number of images from Pavement's "impressive archives" and a Q&A section featuring founders McDonald and Hunt, with the latter joking at the conclusion of the story that the magazine closed because he "was sick of getting the dictionary thrown at me!"

In 2018, allegations by three women of sexual approaches and underage sexual relations involving one of its contributing photographers were detailed in a report on New Zealand news website The Spinoff.

Incensed by the website's "sensationalist, highly unbalanced reporting", McDonald wrote a detailed letter of complaint to the editor in which he took "umbrage with the overarching nature of the story" and "particular issue with the way in which the story's narrative is pursued and the glaring lack of balance in the piece". He concluded by stating that no one at the magazine ever used Pavement to be predatory towards young women. "We used Pavement to promote exciting culture, discover and develop new talent, add excitement and energy to the times we were publishing in, and generally inspire everyone who worked on the magazine or read it. By doing so, we presented advertisers with an exemplary environment and culture in which to market their brand or product. And we did bloody well at it. Nothing you've run on your site will take that away from any of the hundreds, if not thousands, of people who helped make Pavement this country's "coolest" magazine."

References

1993 establishments in New Zealand
2006 disestablishments in New Zealand
Bi-monthly magazines
Cultural magazines
Defunct magazines published in New Zealand
Magazines established in 1993
Magazines disestablished in 2006
Magazines published in New Zealand
Quarterly magazines
Youth magazines